Sarvar Ikramov (born 10 January 1985) is an Uzbekistani former professional tennis player.

Born in Tashkent, Ikramov made an ATP Tour main draw appearance at the 2002 President's Cup in his birth city. 

Ikramov made his Davis Cup debut in 2004 and represented Uzbekistan at the 2006 Asian Games.

During his Davis Cup career he featured in a total of eight ties, the last in 2013. He won three singles rubbers, with his best win coming against China's Zhang Ze.

References

External links
 
 
 

1985 births
Living people
Uzbekistani male tennis players
Sportspeople from Tashkent
Tennis players at the 2006 Asian Games
Asian Games competitors for Uzbekistan
20th-century Uzbekistani people
21st-century Uzbekistani people